The Long Goodbye (The Symphonic Music of Procol Harum) is a tribute album for Procol Harum released in 1995. The main performers on the album are the London Symphony Orchestra and the London Philharmonic Orchestra, with one track performed by Sinfonia of London. The album was produced by longtime Procol Harum vocalist/pianist/songwriter Gary Brooker, and among the various musicians who contributed to the album are Procol Harum members Robin Trower and Matthew Fisher.

Unlike all the other songs on the album, the title track has never been officially released by Procol Harum; Procol Harum played the song on tours and recordings of this have appeared on bootlegs, but never on an official album or single. It was a Gary Brooker solo single and included on the Gary Brooker solo album Echoes in the Night, which was co-produced by Brooker and Fisher, who also co-composed the song's music. Its lyrics were written by Procol Harum's Keith Reid and Procol Harum's B.J. Wilson played drums on the track.

Reception

Allmusic commented that while a symphonic tribute album would seem a natural fit for Procol Harum since they were among the first musicians to attempt to marry rock music with classical music, the new arrangements over-emphasize the symphonic side, "making the music seem less stately than soporific." They also criticized Gary Brooker's vocal performances as unemotional and dull.

Track listing
 "Conquistador"
 "Homburg"
 "Grand Hotel"
 "Simple Sister"
 "A Salty Dog"
 "Pandora's Box"
 "A Whiter Shade of Pale"
 "Repent Walpurgis"
 "(You Can't) Turn Back the Page"
 "Strangers in Space"
 "Butterfly Boys"
 "The Long Goodbye"

Personnel
 London Symphony Orchestra - various instruments
 London Philharmonic Orchestra - various instruments
 Sinfonia of London - various instruments on "The Long Goodbye"
 Matthew Fisher – church organ on "Repent Walpurgis"
 Dave Bronze – bass
 Mark Brzezicki – drums
 Robin Trower – guitar on "Repent Walpurgis"
 Geoff Whitehorn – guitar
 Andy Fairweather Low – guitar
 Gary Brooker – piano, accordion, harpsichord, vocals 
 Keith Reid – lyrics

Also
 Tom Jones – vocals on "Simple Sister"
 Jerry Hadley – vocals on "Grand Hotel" 
 James Galway – flute on "Pandora's Box"

References

External links
 ProcolHarum.com - ProcolHarum.com's page on this album

Procol Harum albums
1996 albums
RCA Records albums